In probability theory, a Hunt process is a strong Markov process which is quasi-left continuous with respect to the minimum completed admissible filtration .

It is named after Gilbert Hunt.

See also
 Markov process
 Markov chain
 Shift of finite type

References

Markov processes